Yinka Dare (October 10, 1972 – January 9, 2004) was a Nigerian professional basketball player. A ,  center, he played four seasons in the National Basketball Association.

Early years
Born in Kano, Dare was discovered by Nigerian-born lawyer Lloyd Ukwu during a visit to Lagos in 1991. While Ukwu was driving, he noticed a very tall man sitting on a bench eating a bowl of food. When he asked him how tall he was, Dare said he didn't know.

Dare had previously spent most of his free time playing tennis, but soon picked up basketball for the first time.

High school/college career
Already in the United States, Dare played one season at Milford Academy High, a prep school in New Berlin, New York.
Subsequently, he played college basketball for George Washington University, where he excelled as a player under coach Mike Jarvis, also helping revive the basketball program. As a freshman in 1992–93, he led the Colonials to the NCAA Tournament round of 16 ("The Sweet 16"), the furthest they had ever advanced.

The next year, Dare led the team to the second round of the tournament. He finished his college career averaging 13.8 points and 10.7 rebounds per game; additionally, after just two seasons, he had become the Colonials' all-time leader in blocked shots, averaging more than two per game.

Professional career
Dare was selected in the first round (14th overall) of the 1994 NBA draft by the New Jersey Nets, agreeing to a six-year, US$9 million guaranteed contract. In the NBA, he would appear in 110 games in four seasons, all with the Nets; in his rookie campaign, he played for three minutes before getting injured (torn ACL) and missing the rest of the season.
 
The Nets left him unprotected during the 1995 expansion draft, but Dare was not selected by either the Toronto Raptors or the Vancouver Grizzlies. In his first full season (1995–96), in which he played a personal best 58 out of 82 games, he turned the ball over 72 times while registering no assists, holding the dubious NBA record for most games played in a season, 58, without recording an assist. During his four-year career, he would rack up a total of four assists accompanied by 96 turnovers, while averaging 2.1 points, 2.6 rebounds, and less than 0.1 assists per game.

In early 1998, Dare was traded, along with David Benoit and Kevin Edwards, to the Orlando Magic, for Brian Evans and Rony Seikaly, and was immediately waived. Subsequently, he played intermittently in other leagues including the Continental Basketball Association and United States Basketball League, until 2003.

Death
Dare died in 2004, after collapsing in his home in Englewood, New Jersey. A medical examiner determined that he had suffered a heart attack due to an arrhythmia condition discovered when he was in college.

Lucious Harris, who joined the Nets in 1997–98, Dare's final season, said: "It's a bad situation. I feel for his family. Just 32, to have a heart attack, that's scary. It always seemed like he was in shape. But things happen and you don't understand why."

Kerry Kittles, who played with Dare in the latter's final two seasons with the Nets, said: "He was a quiet guy, didn't talk that much. He worked hard—he didn't really play much, but he was a fun guy to be around. [He was] young: It makes you think... anything can happen any time. It's in the back of your mind [that] it could happen to you."

Jarvis, who coached Dare at George Washington, told The Washington Post: "Yinka was a kind, gentle person. He was nice to my family, as respectful as anybody I've come into contact with. I don't remember him having a bad word to say about anybody; just a nice, sweet kid."

Dare was survived by parents Gabriel and Joan, two sisters and a brother.

Other appearances
Dare appears as a playable character in the Sega Genesis and Super NES ports of NBA Jam Tournament Edition as a "bonus" player, available on the all-rookie squad at the onset of the game.
He appeared in a Puma shoe commercial.

References

External links
NBA.com profile
Stats at Basketball-Reference
Stats at BasketballReference

1972 births
2004 deaths
Centers (basketball)
Fort Wayne Fury players
George Washington Colonials men's basketball players
Milford Academy alumni
National Basketball Association players from Nigeria
New Jersey Nets draft picks
New Jersey Nets players
Nigerian expatriate basketball people in the United States
Sportspeople from Kano
1998 FIBA World Championship players
United States Basketball League players